Hoodslam is an underground professional wrestling event that takes place in Oakland, California. Created in 2010 by Sam Khandaghabadi as a regular gathering for wrestlers who wanted to perform edgier acts for adults, Hoodslam quickly became a popular event in the Bay Area, attracting over 1,000 attendees at each monthly performance. Hoodslam performances combine the athleticism and tropes of professional wrestling with more bizarre, absurd characters, as well as profanity, sexuality, and public consumption of drugs and alcohol, which are not considered appropriate at mainstream professional wrestling events.

History 
Hoodslam was founded by Sam Khandaghabadi, who had been wrestling since the age of 14. She called together other wrestlers she had met on the West Coast and convinced them to come to the Victory Warehouse in Oakland, a place where underground metal shows were regularly performed. 14 wrestlers participated in the first Hoodslam, and over a dozen cancelled. Khandaghabadi did not charge admission for the any of the 5 shows in 2010.

The gathering continued to be held bi- monthly until May 2011, when people who lived at the Victory Warehouse had parties that got out of control and blamed it on the wrestling. However, in June 2011, slam poet Jamie DeWolf invited Khandaghabadi and the other Hoodslam wrestlers to perform as part of his underground variety art show, Tourettes Without Regrets, at a larger warehouse venue in Oakland, the Oakland Metro Opera House. The popularity of their performance ensured them a regularly monthly spot at the Oakland Metro – on the same night as Oakland's First Friday art gathering – which continued to attract large crowds.

In October 2014, for the first time, the 1,000-person venue sold out before the show began.

Starting in early 2015, an offshoot of Hoodslam, called "Beachslam", began promoting shows in Santa Cruz, California and Knightsen, California featuring many of the same performers and characters as Hoodslam--as well as several new, regional or experimental characters. 

Later in 2019, two more promotions would spin off. The predominantly femme Guilty Lethal Action Mayhem and the cosplay party Sexy Goodtime Wrestle Show.

Style and characteristics 

According to Khandaghabadi, Hoodslam, unlike traditional professional wrestling, is a form of performance art: because the wrestlers do not need to appeal to a young audience and do not have to pretend that their act is real, they can unleash their creativity in a more sophisticated way, simultaneously demonstrating their athleticism and poking fun at the absurdity of professional wrestling. Hoodslam wrestler A.J. Kirsch states that the tagline of the event, "This Is Real," is a tongue-in-cheek reference to the obvious absurdity of the show, which features wrestlers dressed as popular video game characters Ken and Ryu, as well as an "invisible" wrestler, Charlie Chaplin, whom the real wrestlers pretend to battle. Unlike the characters and story lines, however, the physical prowess of the performers is real, and their moves are difficult and dangerous.

As the show unfolds, the performers chant, "fuck the fans," which, according to O.J. Patterson, is a "unifying war chant" that functions as "part reminder not to take things too seriously and part demand for hedonistic excess."

Notable performers 

Many former WWE and ECW wrestlers have made appearances at Hoodslam: since 2013, Brian Kendrick, Paul London, Sinn Bodhi, Shelly Martinez, Gangrel, Sonny Onoo, Drake Younger and Mustafa Saed have performed on the Hoodslam stage.

Other current AEW, WWE, and independent personnel who have appeared at Hoodslam include: Peter Avalon, Leva Bates, Shotzi Blackheart, MVP, Joey Ryan, and Christina Von Eerie.

References

External links

 
 
 

Culture in the San Francisco Bay Area
Art in the San Francisco Bay Area
Professional wrestling shows
Professional wrestling in San Francisco
2010 establishments in California